Academy company is a term used for an organization that is well known as a place to start a professional career and provides leaders to other companies. Often academy companies hire the majority of their staff from recent college and university graduates, and provide extensive training. Academy companies are frequently targeted by executive search firms as sources of talent. Often academy companies have "up or out" policies that facilitate organizational growth and development.

Examples of academy companies:

 PepsiCo
 Procter & Gamble
 General Mills
 Kraft Foods
 Goldman Sachs
 JPMorgan Chase
 General Electric
 McKinsey & Company
 Bain & Company
 Boston Consulting Group
 Hewlett-Packard
 Unilever

References 

Business terms